Jerome Dennis may refer to:
 Jerome Dennis (Canadian football)
 Jerome Dennis (serial killer)